Shulgino is a rural locality (a village) in Tolshmenskoye Rural Settlement, Totemsky  District, Vologda Oblast, Russia. The population was 2 as of 2002.

Geography 
Shulgino is located 85 km southwest of Totma (the district's administrative centre) by road. Filino is the nearest rural locality.

References 

Rural localities in Totemsky District